Şenpazar, formerly Şarbana, is a town in the Kastamonu Province in the Black Sea region of Turkey. It is the seat of Şenpazar District. Its population is 1,609 (2021).

References

Populated places in Kastamonu Province
Şenpazar District
Towns in Turkey